The National Centre for Earth Observation (NCEO) is part of the Natural Environment Research Council (NERC) and looks at improving knowledge of the planet by taking Earth observations from space and aircraft, as well as from the ground, to produce models which will help understand, respond and adapt to climate and environmental changes.

History
The organisation was previously centred at the University of Reading, known nationally for its department of meteorology, which requires satellite observation of the Earth. The NCEO is now at the University of Leicester, known for its research into astronomy and its National Space Centre, and is led by Professor John Remedios.

Structure
The NCEO is based in the United Kingdom and works closely with the UK satellite industry. It is a part of the larger Natural Environment Research Council (NERC).

See also
 British Geological Survey in Rushcliffe, Nottinghamshire
 Centre for Environmental Data Analysis (CEDA) at the Rutherford-Appleton Laboratory at Harwell.
 National Centre for Atmospheric Science at the University of Leeds
 :Category:Earth observation satellites of the European Space Agency

References

External links
NCEO Official Website

Natural Environment Research Council
Organisations based in Leicestershire
Remote sensing research institutes
Research institutes in Leicestershire
Space programme of the United Kingdom
University of Leicester
Earth observation